Tsavo is a region of Kenya located at the crossing of the Uganda Railway over the Tsavo River, close to where it meets the Athi-Galana-Sabaki River. Two national parks, Tsavo East and Tsavo West are located in the area.

The meaning of the word Tsavo is still unclear, but because of tribal conflicts, the Kamba people used to refer to the region as the place of "slaughter". Until the British put an end to the slave trade in the late 19th century, Tsavo was continually crossed by caravans of trans-Saharan slave traders and their captives.
Regions of Kenya

Nature
Typical flora of the region includes:
Acacia
Myrrh
Baobab

Typical fauna of the region includes:
African bush elephant
Giraffe
African buffalo
Gazelle
Klipspringer
Kudu
Leopard
Lion
Cheetah

Native human inhabitants:
The Waata, a bow-hunting people

See also 
 Railway stations in Kenya
 Tsavorite

References 

 Tsavo National Park

Geography of Kenya